Stanley is a 1972 American horror film directed and produced by William Grefé, about a Seminole Indian and a Vietnam veteran who uses his collection of pet snakes to take revenge on his enemies.

Cast
 Chris Robinson as Tim Ockopee
 Alex Rocco as Richard Thomkins
 Steve Alaimo as Crail Denning
 Susan Carroll as Susie Tomkins
 Mark Harris as Bob Wilson

Production
Director William Grefé pitched the film to Crown International's head Red Jacobs after the success of the film Willard (1971).  Grefe stated in March 1972 that he got the idea of the film after having a nightmare about snakes. The film was shot entirely in the Evergaldes and Ivan Tors Studios in Miami, Florida. The cast includes Chris Robinson, who appeared in other films made in Florida, such as Charcoal Black (1972) and Thunder County (1974).

A report in the Daily Variety stated William Loos would score the film, but only  Post Production Associates is credited onscreen for the film score.

Release
Stanley was shown in Los Angeles on May 24, 1972.

References

Sources

External links
 

1972 horror films
American natural horror films
Films about snakes
Films shot in Miami
1970s English-language films
Films directed by William Grefe
1970s American films